Mike Towry is an American co-founder of San Diego Comic-Con International. Towry established the annual convention, then called "San Diego's Golden State Comic Book Convention," in 1970 with a group of friends, including Richard Alf, Shel Dorf and Ken Krueger. Towry served as an early co-chairman of the convention.

In 2009, Towry and the other founders were honored for their contributions by San Diego Comic-Con.

References

Year of birth missing (living people)
People from San Diego
Place of birth missing (living people)
Living people